Living It Up is a 2000 Spanish comedy film directed by Antonio Cuadri.

Cast 
 Salma Hayek - Lola
 Carmelo Gómez - Martin
 Tito Valverde - Salva
 Alicia Agut - Rosa
 Pilar López de Ayala 
 Carlos Bardem - Matón discoteca 1
  - Montero

References

External links 

2000 comedy films
2000 films
Spanish comedy films
2000s Spanish films